Craig Jamieson is Keeper of Sanskrit Manuscripts at the University of Cambridge.

Before Cambridge he taught Buddhism in the Study of Religion Department at the University of Leicester.

His best-known works are Perfection of Wisdom, which has a preface by the Dalai Lama, and Nagarjuna's Verses. A facsimile edition of the Lotus Sutra made available in print two Cambridge palm leaf manuscripts from around one thousand years ago, Add. 1682 and Add. 1683.

A major exhibition took place in 2014 entitled Buddha's Word: The Life of Books in Tibet and Beyond. A short video of the Perfection of Wisdom manuscript came out in 2017.

In 2022 he was included as one of the 200 most notable people in the 200 year history of the University of Wales, Lampeter.

References

External links
 Kota Gelanggi  in Johor
 Buddha’s Word Exhibition  in the Museum of Archaeology and Anthropology, University of Cambridge
 Sanskrit Manuscript Collection  in the University of Cambridge
 Tibetan Manuscript Collection  in the University of Cambridge
 Arts Council Designation as a "collection of outstanding national and international importance"

Alumni of the University of Wales, Lampeter
Academics of the University of Leicester
Academics of the University of Cambridge
Living people
People from Crouch End
Year of birth missing (living people)